Frances C. Butler (born 1940 in St. Louis, Missouri) is an American book artist and educator. Butler received her B.A. in History at the University of California, Berkeley in 1961, her M.A. in History at Stanford University in 1963, and a second M.A. in Design at UC Berkeley in 1966. She was a professor at UC Berkeley from 1968–70, and began teaching at UC Davis in 1970. She ran Goodstuffs Handprinted Fabric from 1973–79, and co-founded Poltroon Press with Alastair Johnston in 1975.

Poltroon Press 
The Poltroon Press was one of several influential small presses in the San Francisco Bay Area, along with Rebis Press (Betsy Davids) and Five Trees Press (Kathleen Walkup, Jamie Robles, Cheryl Miller, etc.), which began their publishing and teaching activities during the mid-1970s.

Minnesota Center for Book Arts 
Butler was the first visiting lecturer at the Minnesota Center for Book Arts and "spoke of book arts in terms of re-defining tradition," challenging the center to adopt a more forward-thinking mission.

Selected solo & group exhibitions 
1981
 Diagrams of Natural Energy, Meyer Breier Weiss, San Francisco
 New Dryads (Are Ready for Your Call), Piater Brattinga Gallery, Amsterdam
 International Artists' Books Show, Art Institute of Chicago
1979
 Art for Wearing, San Francisco Museum of Modern Art
1978
 American Illustration: 1800 to the Present, Oakland Art Museum
1977
 The Object as Poet, Smithsonian Institution, Washington D.C.
1976

 California Design II, Pasadena Art Museum

1975
 Images of an Era—The American Poster 1945–75, Corcoran Gallery of Art, Washington, D.C.
1974

 Clothing to be Seen, Museum of Contemporary Craft

1973
 Anatomy in Fabric, Los Angeles County Museum of Art
 Pop Fabrics, Victoria & Albert Museum, London
1972

 Block Brush and Stencil, Los Angeles County Museum of Art

1970
  Design Eleven, Pasadena Museum of Modern Art

Selected permanent collections 
 Victoria & Albert Museum, London
 The Museum of Modern Art, New York
 The British Museum, London
 Los Angeles County Museum of Art
 Cooper Hewitt, Smithsonian Design Museum, New York
 National Gallery of Art, Washington, D.C.

References 

Book artists
Artists from the San Francisco Bay Area
1940 births
Living people
UC Berkeley College of Letters and Science alumni
Stanford University alumni
University of California, Berkeley faculty
University of California, Davis faculty